Basso is an Italian surname. Notable people with the surname include:

Adriano Basso, Brazilian footballer
Annalise Basso (born 1998), American actress
Anthony Basso, French footballer
Claudio Basso (born 1977), Argentine singer
Dominick Basso (1938–2001), mobster in the Chicago Outfit
Flávio Basso (1968–2015), Brazilian musician
Gabriel Basso (born 1994), American actor
Giandomenico Basso, Italian rally driver
Girolamo Basso della Rovere (1434-1507), Italian Cardinal of the Roman Catholic Church
Guido Basso (born 1937), jazz musician from Montreal
Hamilton Basso (1904 – 1964), American novelist
Ivan Basso, Italian cyclist
Jorge Basso (born 1956), Uruguayan physician and politician
Josias Basso, Brazilian footballer
Keith H. Basso (1940–2013), American anthropologist
Lelio Basso (1903 – 1978), Italian politician and journalist
Leonardo Basso, Italian cyclist
Marino Basso, Italian cyclist
Martín Basso (born 1974), Argentine racing driver
Oscar Basso (1922–2007), Argentine professional football player
Romina Basso, Italian mezzo-soprano
Sonia Basso (born 1954), Italian cross-country skier
Stephen Basso (born 1987), Costa Rican-born American soccer player
Suzanne Basso (1954–2014), American convicted murderer
Tom Basso, American financier and trader
Basso, pseudonym of Natsume Ono (born 1977), Japanese manga artist

Italian-language surnames